Philippe Descola, FBA (born 19 June 1949) is a French anthropologist noted for studies of the Achuar, one of several Jivaroan peoples, and for his contributions to anthropological theory.

Background 
Descola started with an interest in philosophy and later became a student of Claude Lévi-Strauss. His ethnographic studies in the Amazon region of Ecuador began in 1976 and was funded by CNRS. He lived with the Achuar from 1976 to 1978. His reputation largely arises from these studies. As a professor, he was invited several times in the University of São Paulo, Beijing, Chicago, Montreal, London School of Economics, Cambridge, St. Petersburg, Buenos Aires, Gothenburg, Uppsala and Leuven. He has given lectures in over forty universities and academic institutions abroad, including the Beatrice Blackwood Lecture at Oxford, the George Lurcy Lecture at Chicago, the Munro Lecture at Edinburgh, the Radcliffe-Brown Lecture at the British Academy, the Clifford Geertz Memorial Lecture at Princeton, the Jensen Lecture at Frankfurt and the Victor Goldschmidt Lecture at Heidelberg. He has chaired the Société des Américanistes since 2002 and the scientific committee of the Fondation Fyssen from 2001 to 2009, as well as holding memberships in many other scientific committees. He has also be elected Honorary fellow of the Royal Anthropological Institute and received in 2015 the honoris causa doctorate from the University of Montreal, Canada. Descola is currently chair of anthropology at the Collège de France. His wife, Anne-Christine Taylor, is an ethnologist.

Distinctions 
 1996: CNRS Silver medal
 1997: Knight of the French Order of Academic Palms
 2004: French National Order of Merit
 2006: Foreign Honorary Members of the American Academy of Arts and Sciences
 2010: Elected as corresponding fellow of the British Academy
 2010: Officer in the French Legion of Honor
 2011: Édouard Bonnefous Prize from Academy of Moral and Political Sciences
 2012: CNRS Gold Medal
 2014: International Cosmos Prize
 2016: Commander in the French Legion of Honor

Partial bibliography 
 
 
 
 
 Les Formes du visible, Paris:Seuil, 2021,

Further reading

References

External links 
 Laboratoire d'anthropologie sociale (Official site) 
 Research
 Collège de France Chaire d'Anthropologie de la nature 
 Radio France Article
 Who owns nature ?, by Philippe Descola, La Vie des idées, 21 janvier 2008.
 Interviewed by Alan Macfarlane 3 February 2015 (video)

Living people
ENS Fontenay-Saint-Cloud-Lyon alumni
French anthropologists
1949 births
Corresponding Fellows of the British Academy
Fellows of the American Academy of Arts and Sciences